The Taillefer Rocks, part of the Schouten Island Group, are three small, rugged, granite islands, with a combined area of approximately  lying close to the eastern coast of Tasmania, Australia, near the Freycinet Peninsula and lies within the Freycinet National Park.

Flora and fauna
This is one of the few islands where Oyster Bay pines occur.

Recorded breeding seabird species are little penguin, short-tailed shearwater, fairy prion and common diving petrel. Reptiles present include the metallic skink, White's skink, spotted skink and mountain dragon. Australian fur seals haul-out there in small numbers.

See also

Protected areas of Tasmania
List of islands of Tasmania

References

Islands of Tasmania
East Coast Tasmania
Protected areas of Tasmania